Herbert Thomas Sullivan (13 May 1868 – 26 November 1928), known as "Bertie", was the nephew, heir and biographer of the British composer Arthur Sullivan.  He grew up as his uncle's ward and worked briefly as an engineer.  After his uncle's death, Sullivan became active in charitable work. He was co-author of a 1927 biography of Arthur Sullivan, well regarded in its day, but later discredited because of its suppression of the composer's diary entries that mentioned his gambling and philandering.

Sullivan inherited many of his uncle's papers and original music manuscripts. Sullivan left most of these to his wife, who died in 1957, and they finally were sold to collectors in 1966.

Biography
Sullivan was the third child and eldest son of Frederic and Charlotte Sullivan, one of eight siblings. When Fred Sullivan died aged 39 in 1877, his younger brother, the composer Arthur Sullivan, made himself responsible for the support of Fred's widow and eight children. In 1881, Charlotte married Captain Benjamin Hutchinson, a man 13 years her junior. Charlotte emigrated to the US in 1883 with her husband and all her children except Herbert, who remained in England under the care of his uncle. At the age of nine, Sullivan began boarding school in Brighton, England. He studied in Germany in the autumn of 1884.

Arthur Sullivan's health was precarious from the 1880s onwards, and Herbert often accompanied his uncle to the South of France and other resorts where the composer rested or spent holidays. In late 1890, at 22 years of age, Herbert left his uncle's home for an engineering job connected with the laying of a cable between Haiti and Brazil. Herbert soon returned to England, and he continued to spend much of his time with his uncle, continuing as his companion at the theatre and on trips. Though never formally adopted, Herbert was in many respects Arthur Sullivan's adopted son. He was at his uncle's bedside at his death in 1900. When Arthur died, the German Emperor Wilhelm, an admirer of Sullivan's works, sent Herbert a personal message of condolence. Herbert remained friendly with his uncle's collaborator, W. S. Gilbert, after Arthur's death; when Herbert organised a Garrick Club dinner in 1908, in honour of Gilbert, the dramatist wrote, "My dear Sullivan, There is little need to tell you how deeply I appreciate the good feeling that actuated you in organizing yesterday's most successful dinner. It is an instance of friendship that can never fade from my memory".

After his uncle's death, Herbert Sullivan inherited the bulk of the composer's estate, including his diaries and many of his important musical manuscripts. He became prominent in pro bono publico activities, and in April 1915 he contributed the manuscript of Utopia Limited by Gilbert and Sullivan to a charity auction in aid of the Red Cross. During the First World War, Herbert became a King's Messenger. While in this service, his ship was hit by a torpedo, and he spent hours in the freezing waters of the North Sea. Afterwards, he found walking painful and used a cane. While on his yacht Zola, in 1921, he retrieved mail from the English Channel after an aeroplane crash. In 1923 he married Elena Margarita Vincent. He served as Warden of the Worshipful Company of Musicians in 1925 and as Master of the Company in 1926.

In 1927 Sullivan collaborated with Newman Flower on a biography of Arthur Sullivan. As Sullivan and Flower had exclusive access to the composer's diaries, the biography was regarded at the time as uniquely authoritative. Subsequently, when wider access to the diaries became possible, it was seen that Sullivan had suppressed mention of his uncle's gambling and womanising, and this evasion, combined with the lack of musical analysis in the biography, led to a lowering of its status among scholars.

Sullivan died suddenly in London in 1928, aged 60.  His estate included many of his uncle's manuscripts. His widow remarried about 1929, becoming Mrs Elena M. Bashford. She died in 1957, and the manuscripts were sold at auction in 1966 by her estate, some going to museums and collectors in America and others remaining in England. Several of the autograph scores were bought by the Gilbert and Sullivan scholar and collector Dr Terence Rees and others by dealers.

Notes, references and sources

Notes

References

Sources     

People associated with Gilbert and Sullivan
Writers from London
English biographers
1868 births
1928 deaths